Synthetic Communications is a peer-reviewed scientific journal covering the synthesis of organic compounds.

Biochemistry journals
Publications established in 1971
English-language journals
Taylor & Francis academic journals